AAC Technologies Holdings, Inc., or AAC Technologies in short form, is a civilian-run enterprise founded in 1993 and headquartered in Shenzhen, PR China. It engages in the manufacture and distribution of miniaturized acoustic components.

AAC Technologies designs, develops and manufactures a broad range of miniaturized components that include speakers, receivers and microphones in the acoustic segment. It produces these components for mobile devices such as smartphones, tablets, wearables, ultrabooks, notebooks and e-readers.

AAC Technologies is one of the main suppliers of Apple Inc.

References

External links

 

Civilian-run enterprises of China
Semiconductor companies of China
Manufacturing companies based in Shenzhen
Companies established in 1993